Klas Filip Cheick Tidjane Apelstav (born 18 September 1971) is a Swedish former professional footballer who played as a defender. He played for IFK Norrköping and was a member of the Sweden Olympic football team that competed at the 1992 Summer Olympics in Barcelona, Spain. He was also a part of the Sweden U21 team that finished second at the 1992 UEFA European Under-21 Championship.

References

Links

1971 births
Living people
Swedish footballers
Association football defenders
Olympic footballers of Sweden
Footballers at the 1992 Summer Olympics
Sweden under-21 international footballers
Sweden youth international footballers
Swedish expatriate footballers
Eliteserien players
IFK Norrköping players
Kongsvinger IL Toppfotball players
Sogndal Fotball players
Expatriate footballers in China
Expatriate footballers in Norway